4-Pyrrolidinylpyridine is an organic compound with the formula (CH2)4NC5H4N.  The molecule consists of a pyrrodinyl group ((CH2)4N-) attached via N to the 4-position of pyridine.  It is a white solid.  The compound has attracted interest because it (pKa = 9.58) is more basic than dimethylaminopyridine (pKa = 9.41). It is a popular base catalyst.

References

Reagents for organic chemistry
Aminopyridines
Catalysts
Pyrrolidines